Abuna Abraham was a cleric of the Ethiopian Orthodox Tewahedo Church, who was installed as the Archbishop of the Ethiopian church during the Fascist Italian occupation following the Second Italo-Ethiopian War, in place of the legitimate Archbishop Abuna Qerellos IV. 

On 27 November 1937, Marshal Rodolfo Graziani convened an assembly of Ethiopian clergymen to elect a new Archbishop. Abuna Abraham, bishop of Gojjam, was elected. On 28 December 1937, the Holy Synod of the Coptic Orthodox Church of Alexandria under Pope John XIX declared the election illegitimate and excommunicated the new Archbishop. 

Ignoring the interdiction of the Holy Synod and the Pope, Abuna Abraham and his successor Abuna Yohannes XV (r. 1939–1945) designated eleven bishops in order to constitute a full ecclesiastical hierarchy before the Italian occupation ended in 1941.

References 

Year of birth missing
Year of death missing
Archbishops of Ethiopia
20th-century Oriental Orthodox bishops
20th century in Ethiopia
People excommunicated by Christian churches